Sara and Hoppity is a children's puppet television series, created and produced by Roberta Leigh. It was based on a series of four books written by Leigh and illustrated by Marion Wilson. Most of this series no longer exists in the archives, but the first episode and episode 46 are known to exist.

Background
The series ran from 27 February 1962 until 26 February 1963, with 52 episodes of about thirteen minutes. The copyright date on the first episode is 1960.

The show was produced by Roberta Leigh and directed by Arthur Provis. The art director was Bill Palmer, and the editor was Peter Saunders. The puppets were made by Jack Whitehead and operated by Jane Tyson, Jane Phillips and Michael Whitehead. Roberta Leigh wrote the screenplay, music and lyrics. The music was arranged by Ronald Hanmer and the show was made by P. P. Productions of Teddington for Roberta Leigh. Unlike some similar puppet shows of the time, the puppet strings were all but invisible.

Plot
Sara Brown lives with her parents, above their "Toy Hospital" shop. In the first episode an old man brings in a broken toy, which he has found in a goblin ring, to sell. The toy, called "Hoppity", can sing and dance, but it is a "falling over dance" as the toy only has one leg. Her parents want nothing to do with the toy, but Miss Julie who lives up in the attic and makes clothes for all the toys, gives Sara the money to buy Hoppity.

The man accepts six pence. Sara washes the dirty toy and her father finds it a new leg, but one a little bit shorter than the other. Miss Julie gives her clothes for him, and her mother gives Hoppity two shiny glass beads for eyes. Her mother cuts off a little of Sara's hair and puts it on the bald doll's head. Miss Julie also gives Sara an apron with a pocket big enough for Hoppity.

When wound up, the toy dances and sings annoying "Diddly dum, diddly dee" song, which Sara somehow understands. Being very naughty, Hoppity's ideas often lead Sara into trouble. For example, in the first episode, she cuts all the flowers from an expensive hat, belonging to her step aunt Matilda, to put in a vase on the dining table.

External links
Fan website (archived 29-August-2011)
 

1962 British television series debuts
1963 British television series endings
1960s British children's television series
Black-and-white British television shows
ITV children's television shows
Fictional dolls and dummies
British television shows featuring puppetry
Television shows produced by Associated-Rediffusion
English-language television shows